El Khroub is a district in Constantine Province, Algeria. It was named after its capital, El Khroub. As of the 1998 census, it is the second most populous District of the Province, after Constantine.

Municipalities
The district is further divided into 3 municipalities:
El Khroub
Aïn Smara
Ouled Rahmoun

Districts of Constantine Province